Maen Castle is an Iron Age promontory fort or 'cliff castle' close to Land's End in Cornwall.  It is one of only two fortified sites in Cornwall where Early Iron Age pottery has been found.  Excavations took place in 1939 and 1948-9 and about 300 sherds were unearthed.

The defences comprise a stone rampart, ditch and counterscarp bank built across the neck of the headland, with almost sheer cliffs on two sides and a steep slope on the third.  There are some indications that the site may have been occupied before these defences were constructed.

See also

List of hill forts in England
List of hill forts in Scotland
List of hill forts in Wales

References

External links
 Maen Castle Retrieved 14 May 2007.

Hill forts in Cornwall
Iron Age sites in Cornwall
Sennen